Batavia was a ship of the Dutch East India Company (VOC). Built in Amsterdam in 1628 as the company's new flagship, she sailed that year on her maiden voyage for Batavia, capital of the Dutch East Indies. On 4 June 1629, Batavia was wrecked on the Houtman Abrolhos, a chain of small islands off the western coast of Australia.

As the ship broke apart, approximately 300 of the Batavia'''s 341 passengers made their way ashore, the rest drowning in their attempts. The ship's commander, Francisco Pelsaert, sailed to Batavia to get help, leaving in charge Jeronimus Cornelisz, a senior VOC official who, unbeknownst to Pelsaert, had been plotting a mutiny prior to the wreck. Cornelisz sent about 20 men under soldier Wiebbe Hayes to nearby islands under the pretense of having them search for fresh water, abandoning them there to die. With the help of other mutineers, he then orchestrated a massacre that, over the course of several weeks, resulted in the murder of approximately 125 of the remaining survivors, including women, children and infants; a small number of women were kept as sex slaves, among them Lucretia Jans, who was reserved by Cornelisz for himself.

Meanwhile, Hayes' group had unexpectedly found fresh water and, after learning of the atrocities, waged battles with Cornelisz's group. In October 1629, at the height of their last and deadliest battle, they were interrupted by the return of Pelsaert aboard the rescue vessel, Sardam. Pelsaert subsequently tried and convicted Cornelisz and six of his men, who became the first Europeans to be legally executed in Australia. Two other henchmen, convicted of comparatively minor crimes, were marooned on mainland Australia, thus becoming the first Europeans to permanently inhabit the Australian continent. Of the original 341 people on board Batavia, only 122 made it to the port of Batavia.

Associated today with "one of the worst horror stories in maritime history", Batavia has been the subject of numerous published histories, the earliest dating from 1647. Due to its unique place in the history of European contact with Australia, the story of Batavia is sometimes offered as an alternative founding narrative to the landing of British convicts in Sydney. Many Batavia artifacts, including the ship's stern and skeletal remains from the massacre, are housed at the Shipwreck Galleries in Fremantle, Western Australia, while a replica of the ship is moored as a museum ship in Lelystad in the Netherlands.

Maiden voyage
On 27 October 1628, the newly built Batavia, commissioned by the Dutch East India Company (VOC), sailed from Texel in the Netherlands for the Dutch East Indies, to obtain spices. They were to use the Brouwer Route, like all ships of the Dutch East India Company.

It sailed under commander and senior merchant Francisco Pelsaert, with Ariaen Jacobsz serving as skipper. Pelsaert and Jacobsz had previously encountered each other in Dutch Suratte, when Pelsaert publicly dressed-down Jacobsz after he became drunk and insulted Pelsaert in front of other merchants. Animosity existed between the two men after this incident. Also on board was the junior merchant Jeronimus Cornelisz (30), a bankrupt apothecary from Haarlem who was fleeing the Netherlands, in fear of arrest because of his heretical beliefs associated with the painter Johannes van der Beeck.

 Mutiny plot 
According to Pelsaert's account, Jacobsz and Cornelisz conceived a plan to take the ship during the voyage, which would allow them to start a new life elsewhere, using the huge supply of trade gold and silver on board. After leaving the Cape of Good Hope, where they had stopped for supplies, Jacobsz is alleged by Pelsaert to have deliberately steered the ship off course, and away from the rest of the fleet. Jacobsz and Cornelisz had already gathered a small group of men around them and arranged an incident from which the mutiny was to ensue. This involved sexually assaulting a prominent young female passenger, Lucretia Jans, in order to provoke Pelsaert into disciplining the crew. They hoped to paint his discipline as unfair and recruit more members out of sympathy. However, the woman was able to identify her attackers.

 Shipwreck 

On 4 June 1629, Batavia struck Morning Reef near Beacon Island, part of the Houtman Abrolhos off the western coast of Australia. Of the 322 aboard, most of the passengers and crew managed to get ashore, although 40 people drowned. The survivors, including all the women and children, were then transferred to nearby islands in the ship's longboat and yawl.

An initial survey of the islands found no fresh water and only limited food (sea lions and birds). Pelsaert realised the dire situation and decided to search for water on the mainland. A group consisting of Jacobsz, Pelsaert, senior officers, a few crew members, and some passengers left the wreck site in a  longboat in search of drinking water. After an unsuccessful search for water on the mainland, they left the other survivors and headed north in a danger-fraught voyage to the city of Batavia, Dutch East Indies, the ship's namesake, to seek rescue. En route the crew made further forays onto the mainland in search of fresh water.

In his journal, Pelsaert stated that on 15 June 1629, they sailed through a channel between a reef and the coast, finding an opening around midday at a latitude guessed to be about 23 degrees south where they were able to land, and water was found. The group spent the night on land. Pelsaert commented on the vast number of termite mounds in the vicinity and the plague of flies that afflicted them. Pelsaert stated that they continued north with the intention of finding the "river of Jacob Remmessens", identified first in 1622, but owing to the wind were unable to land. Drake-Brockman has suggested that this location is to be identified with Yardie Creek.

It was not until the longboat reached the island of Nusa Kambangan in the Dutch East Indies that Pelsaert and the others found more water. The journey took 33 days, with everyone surviving. After their arrival in Batavia, the boatswain, Jan Evertsz, was arrested and executed for negligence and "outrageous behavior" before the loss of the ship (he was suspected to have been involved). Jacobsz was also arrested for negligence, although his culpability in the potential mutiny was not guessed by Pelsaert.

Pelsaert returned to the vicinity of ocean where the mishap occurred within a month, but it took another month of searching to locate the islands again. He finally arrived at the site only to discover that a bloody massacre had taken place among the survivors, reducing their numbers by at least a hundred.

Murders

Cornelisz was one of a few men who stayed on Batavia to pillage and steal. He was one of the few who survived the final break-up of the ship and made it to Beacon Island after floating for two days. Though neither sailor nor soldier, Cornelisz was elected to be in charge of the survivors due to his senior rank in the Dutch East India Company. He made plans to hijack any rescue ship that might return and use the vessel to seek another safe haven. Cornelisz made far-fetched plans to start a new kingdom, using the gold and silver from the wreck. However, to carry out this plan, he first needed to eliminate possible opponents.

Cornelisz's first deliberate act was to have all weapons and food supplies commandeered and placed under his control. They were told to send smoke signals when they found water and they would then be rescued. Convinced that they would be unsuccessful, he then left them there to die, taking complete control of the remaining survivors.

Cornelisz never committed any of the murders himself, although he tried and failed to poison a baby (who was eventually strangled). Instead, he coerced others into doing it for him, usually under the pretense that the victim had committed a crime such as theft. Cornelisz and his henchmen had originally murdered to save themselves, but eventually they began to kill for pleasure or out of habit. Cornelisz planned to reduce the island's population to around 45 so that their supplies would last as long as possible. He also feared that many of the survivors remained loyal to the company. In total, Cornelisz' followers murdered at least 110 men, women, and children. A small number of women were kept as sex slaves; among them was Jans, who was reserved by Cornelisz for himself.

Rescue

Although Cornelisz had left the soldiers, led by Hayes, to die, they had in fact found good sources of water and food on West Wallabi Island. Initially, they were unaware of the massacres taking place and sent pre-arranged smoke signals announcing their finds. However, they soon learned of the killings from survivors fleeing Beacon Island. In response, the soldiers devised makeshift weapons from materials washed up from the wreck. They also set a watch so that they were ready for the Cornelisz' men, and built a small fort out of limestone and coral blocks.

Cornelisz seized on the news of water on the other island, as his own supply was dwindling and the continued survival of the soldiers threatened his own success. He went with his men to try to defeat the soldiers marooned on West Wallabi Island. However, the trained soldiers were by now much better fed than Cornelisz' group and easily defeated them in several battles, eventually taking Cornelisz hostage. His men who escaped regrouped under soldier Wouter Loos and tried again, this time employing muskets to besiege Hayes' fort and almost defeating the soldiers. However, Hayes' men prevailed again just as Sardam arrived. A race to the rescue ship ensued between Cornelisz' men and the soldiers. Hayes reached the ship first and was able to present his side of the story to Pelsaert. After a short battle, the combined force captured all of Cornelisz's group.

Aftermath

Pelsaert decided to conduct a trial on the islands, because Sardam on the return voyage to Batavia would have been overcrowded with both survivors and prisoners. After a brief trial, the worst offenders were taken to Seal Island and executed. Cornelisz and several of his henchmen had both hands chopped off before being hanged.

Loos and a cabin boy, Jan Pelgrom de Bye, who were considered only minor offenders, were marooned on mainland Australia, and were never heard of again. This made them the first Europeans to have permanently lived on the Australian continent. This location is now thought to be Wittecarra Creek near Kalbarri, Western Australia, though another suggestion is nearby Port Gregory.

The rest of Cornelisz' henchmen were taken to Batavia for trial. Five were hanged, while several others were flogged, keelhauled or dropped from the yardarm on the later voyage back home. Cornelisz' second in command, Jacop Pietersz, was broken on the wheel, the most severe punishment available at the time. Jacobsz, despite being tortured, did not confess to his part in plotting the mutiny and escaped execution due to lack of evidence. What finally became of him is unknown; he might have died in prison in Batavia. A board of inquiry decided that Pelsaert had exercised a lack of authority and was therefore partly responsible for what had happened. His financial assets were seized, and he died within a year.

Hayes was hailed a hero and promoted to sergeant, which increased his salary, while those who had been under his command were promoted to the rank of corporal. Of the original 332 people on board Batavia, only 122 made it to the port of Batavia. Sardam eventually sailed home with most of the treasure previously carried on Batavia aboard. Of the twelve treasure chests that were originally on board, ten were recovered and taken aboard Sardam.

 Wreck 

Surveying the north-west coast of the Abrolhos Islands for the British Admiralty in April 1840, Captain John Lort Stokes reported that "the beams of a large vessel were discovered", assumed to be , "on the south west point of an island", reminding them that since Zeewijks crew "reported having seen a wreck of a ship on this part, there is little doubt that the remains were those of the Batavia".

In the 1950s, historian Henrietta Drake-Brockman argued, from extensive archival research, that the Batavia wreck must lie in the Wallabi group of islands. The wreck was first sighted in 1963 by lobster fisherman David Johnson. Many artifacts were salvaged in the 1970s, including port-side stern timbers, cannons and an anchor. To facilitate the monitoring and any future treatment, the hull timbers were erected on a steel frame. Its design—and that of a stone arch, also recovered—was such that individual components could be easily removed.

In 1972, the Dutch government transferred rights to Dutch shipwrecks in Australian waters to the Australian government. Excavated items are on display at the Western Australian Museum's various locations, though the majority of cannons and anchors have been left in situ. The wreck remains one of the premier diving sites on the Western Australian coast.

TreasureBatavia carried a considerable amount of treasure. Each ship in the Batavia class carried an estimated 250,000 guilders in twelve wooden chests, each containing about 8,000 silver coins. This money was intended for the purchase of spices and other commodities in Java. The bulk of these coins were silver rijksdaalder produced by the individual Dutch states, with the remainder being mostly made up of similar coins produced by German cities such as Hamburg.

Pelsaert was instructed to recover as much of the money as possible on his return to the Abrolhos Islands, using divers "to try if it is possible to salvage all the money [and] the casket of jewels that before your departure was already saved on the small island". Recovery of the money was far from easy. Pelsaert reported difficulties in pulling up heavy chests, e.g. 27 October 1629, when a chest had to be marked with a buoy for later recovery. On 9 November, he recorded sending four money chests to Sardam, and three the next day, but then abandoned further recovery work. By 13 November, Pelsaert recorded that ten money chests had been recovered—about 80,000 coins—leaving two lost since there had been twelve loaded originally. One was jammed under a cannon, and the other one had been broken open by Cornelisz' men.Batavias treasure also included special items being carried by Pelsaert for sale to the Mogul Court in India where he had intended to travel on to. There were four jewel bags, stated to be worth about 60,000 guilders, and an early-fourth-century Roman cameo, as well as numerous other items either now displayed in Fremantle and Geraldton, Western Australia, or recovered by Pelsaert.

 Legacy 

A Batavia ship replica was built from 1985 to 1995, using the same materials and methods utilized in the early 17th century. After a number of commemorative voyages, the vessel is now moored as a museum ship in Lelystad in the Netherlands.

 Media 
The story was retold in Hugh Edwards' Islands of Angry Ghosts which described the wreck and aftermath and then followed with the story of the discovery and recovery. In 1973, Bruce Beresford produced a film about the ship called The Wreck of the Batavia. Another documentary film, The Batavia – Wreck, Mutiny and Murder, was aired on the Nine Network in 1995. In 2001 the Welsh author Mike Dash published his book, Batavia's Graveyard: The True Story of the Mad Heretic Who Led History's Bloodiest Mutiny, a historiographic account of the events and people aboard the Batavia.  In 2012 Peter Fitzsimons released a book called Batavia discussing the events in detail and in 2017, a 60 Minutes report detailed the archaeological recovery of the skeletal remains of some of the victims. Casefile True Crime Podcast also covered the incident in detail in February 2020, as did Omnibus, Ken Jennings and John Roderick's podcast in 2022. The voyage, shipwreck and subsequent events are the subject of David Mark's 2022 novel Anatomy of a Heretic''.

See also 
List of massacres in Australia
Shipwrecks of Western Australia

References

Bibliography

Further reading

External links 

 
 

 
1620s ships
Crime in Western Australia
History of Western Australia
Maritime history of the Dutch East India Company
Naval mutinies
Ships of the Dutch East India Company
Shipwrecks of Western Australia